The Cobra Militia, is also known as Forces Démocratique and Patriotique (FDP), was a pro-Nguesso militia during the Civil war that fought for Denis Sassou Nguesso. Mostly recruiting from the unpopulated north of the Republic of Congo, the cobra militia had a force of 8,000.

History
Founded sometime in 1993 or before, The Cobra militia is a militia loyal to Denis Sassou Nguesso, In 1993 the first civil war broke out. It was during this time or just before it. During the war the Cobra militia battled Lissouba's Cocoye Militia killing up to 2,000 people, eventually ending in a peace agreement.

In 1997 the second civil war broke out between the Cobra militia on one side and the Cocoye Militia, Nsiloulou Militia, and its former ally the Ninja militia on the other. With help from Angola, the Cobra militia was able to gain the upper hand and defeat the pro-Lissouba forces.

Fall of Brazzaville
In Brazzaville, a battle between the pro-Lissouba forces and the cobra militia left much of the capital destroyed, leaving behind burned-out ruins and wrecked armored vehicles. As the pro-Lissouba forces retreated after the fierce battle, the Cobra militia looted hundreds of Homes, Businesses, and vehicles.

Human rights violations
The Cobra militia has committed numerus human rights violations, the cobra militia has deliberately killed unarmed civilians accused of supporting their enemies, rape, and looting.

References 

Guerrilla organizations
Rebel groups in the Republic of the Congo